The 26th South East Asian Junior and Cadet Table Tennis Championships 2022 were held in Bangkok, Thailand, from 17 to 22 June 2022.

Medal summary

Events

Medal table

See also

2022 World Junior Table Tennis Championships
2022 Asian Junior and Cadet Table Tennis Championships
Asian Table Tennis Union

References

South East Asian Table Tennis Championships
South East Asian Junior and Cadet Table Tennis Championships
South East Asian Junior and Cadet Table Tennis Championships 
South East Asian Junior and Cadet Table Tennis Championships
Table tennis competitions in Thailand
International sports competitions hosted by Thailand
South East Asian Junior and Cadet Table Tennis Championships